Doridoidea, commonly known as dorid nudibranchs (and previously known as the taxon Cryptobranchia), are a taxonomic superfamily of medium to large, shell-less sea slugs, marine gastropod mollusks in the clade Doridacea, included in the clade Nudibranchia.

Etymology
The word "Doridoidea" comes from the generic name Doris, which was in turn copied from the name of the sea nymph, Doris, in Greek mythology.

Families

According to the Taxonomy of the Gastropoda (Bouchet & Rocroi, 2005), families within the superfamily Doridoidea include:
 Actinocyclidae O'Donoghue, 1929
 Chromodorididae Bergh, 1891
 Discodorididae Bergh, 1891
 Dorididae Rafinesque, 1815

Changes later than 2005
The family Cadlinidae Bergh, 1891 was considered a synonym of the Chromodorididae. Research by R.F. Johnson in 2011  has shown that Cadlina does not belong to the family Chromodorididae. She has therefore brought back the name Cadlinidae from synonymy with Chromodorididae. The chromodorid nudibranchs without Cadlina are now monophyletic and turn out to be a possible sister to the Actinocyclidae

Currently Recognized Families
 Actinocyclidae O'Donoghue, 1929
 Cadlinidae Bergh, 1891
 Chromodorididae Bergh, 1891
 Discodorididae Bergh, 1891
 Dorididae Rafinesque, 1815

Synonyms

The next families are considered synonyms. But these names can still be found in many publications and on the internet.

 Aldisidae Odhner, 1939 - synonym of Cadlinidae
 Archidorididae Bergh, 1891 - synonym of Dorididae
 Asteronotidae Thiele, 1931 - synonym of Discodorididae
 Baptodorididae Odhner, 1926 - synonym of Discodorididae
 Conualeviidae Collier & Farmer, 1964 - synonym of Dorididae
 Geitodorididae Odhner, 1968 - synonym of Discodorididae
 Halgerdidae Odhner, 1926 - synonym of Discodorididae
 Homoiodorididae Bergh, 1882 -synonym of Dorididae and Dendrodorididae
 Kentrodorididae Bergh, 1891 - synonym of Discodorididae
 Platydorididae Bergh, 1891 - synonym of Discodorididae
 Rostangidae Pruvot-Fol, 1951 - synonym of Discodorididae

Cryptobranch dorid nudibranchs 
Cryptobranch dorid nudibranchs (previously known as the taxon Cryptobranchia), are nudibranch sea slugs within the clade Doridacea. These slugs are called "cryptobranch," meaning "hidden gill", because they are able to retract their gills into a gill pocket, in contrast to nudibranchs in the traditional group phanerobranchs (or Phanerobranchia), which taxon is probably paraphyletic (in other words, composed of more than one evolutionary lineage).

A. Valdés distinguishes two major clades within the Cryptobranchia: the dorids that have no radula (the Porostomata); and those with a radula (the Labiostomata). The Labiostomata include the monophyletic families: Actinocyclidae, Chromodorididae, Dorididae and Discodorididae.

The cryptobranchs include the following genera that are regarded as valid:

References

 
Nudipleura
Gastropod superfamilies
Taxa named by Constantine Samuel Rafinesque